The  is a commuter electric multiple unit (EMU) train type operated by the private railway operator Keisei Electric Railway in the Tokyo area of Japan since 1982. The trains were built to replace the former 210 and 700 series.

Operation

The Keisei 3600 series can operate on all Keisei lines and through service onto the Toei Asakusa Line. This series, out of Keisei commuter trains, is the only type that can through service with the Asakusa Line but not onto the Keikyu Line.

Formations
, the fleet consists of five eight-car sets and one four-car set, formed as follows.

8-car sets
The eight-car sets are formed as shown below, with six motored ("M") cars and two non-powered trailer ("T") cars, and car 1 at the northern end.

Cars 2 and 6 each have two scissors-type pantographs, while car 4 has one.

4-car sets
The four-car set, 3668, is formed as shown below, with all four cars motored.

Cars 2 and 4 each have one scissors-type pantograph.

Interior
Seating consists of longitudinal bench seating throughout.

History

Set 3608 was completed by Tokyu Car in June 1982. Commercial operation commenced on 17 July 1982. Initially, it was operated only within the Keisei Line, and did not operate on the Asakusa Line.

The car body was adopted for the first time in Keisei as a lightweight all-stainless structure that was being put into practical use. Like the 3500 series, an orange band was placed above and below the front and side windows of the train, but from September 1992 to March 1993, it was formed in 3608 - 3638 formation bands of side window tops, changed from orange to blue. In September 1993, set 3648 changed the front and side window lower zone from orange to red and blue, and the change of the whole organization was completed by June 1995. Initially, the band of the side door part was omitted, but the band was affixed at the time of paint change. On the side door closing part there is a plate attached, with the notation of the writing style Keisei logo. In March 2001, along with the introduction of the Kei Group's CI, the K'SEI GROUP logo was affixed to all sides of all vehicles.

Field chopper sets
In June 1997, by interposing 3628 knitted intermediate electric vehicle units in 3638/3648 organization, the following 8-car fixed formation was constructed. At this time, the pantograph on the Narita end of Moha 3636 and Moha 3646 was removed.

In December 1998, by interposing 3668 organization intermediate electric motor units in sets 3678 and 3688, respectively, the following 8-car fixed formation was composed. At this time, the pantograph on the Narita side of Moha 3666 and Moha 3662 was removed.

In September 1999, by interposing 3608 knitted intermediate electric vehicle units in 3618/3658 formation, the following 8-car fixed formation was constructed. At this time, the pantograph on the Narita end of Moha 3606 and Moha 3602 was removed.

In September 2000, set 3648 near the Keisei Main Line Onigoshi station encountered a collision accident with a car at a railroad crossing, and the Moha 3643 - Moha 3642 unit was set aside for restoration work. After that, it returned to the March 2001 design and was restored to the original 8 fixed form, and marketing operations were started with the following provisional 6 fixed formations. The pantograph was mounted at the same place as the previous Moha 3646 only at the time of provisional formation.

VVVF inverter control sets
In February 1999, Kuha 3621, Kuha 3628, Kuha 3661, Kuha 3668, which had been treated as idle cars, became electric vehicles, and the operation was temporarily restarted by organizing the following four-car train formation. It was also operated on the Kanamachi Line because it is a 4-car formation.

In August 1999, cars Kuha 3601 and Kuha 3608 were converted into an intermediate car after being incorporated into set 3668, forming the following six-car formation.

Car 3608 is equipped with a pantograph.

Livery variations 
In summer 2020, set 3688 was given a vintage livery with a fire orange band.

Withdrawals
In February 2017, set 3618 and two cars from set 3668 (cars 3608 and 3601) were withdrawn. As a result, set 3668 became a four-car set.

References

External links

 Keisei rolling stock descriptions 

Keisei Electric Railway
Electric multiple units of Japan
Train-related introductions in 1982
1500 V DC multiple units of Japan
Nippon Sharyo multiple units
Tokyu Car multiple units